The 1962–63 Taça de Portugal was the 23rd edition of the Portuguese football knockout tournament, organized by the Portuguese Football Federation (FPF). The 1962–63 Taça de Portugal began on 23 September 1962. The final was played on 30 June 1963 at the Estádio Nacional.

Benfica were the previous holders, having defeated Vitória de Setúbal 3–0 in the previous season's final. Defending champions Benfica were eliminated in the semi-finals by Sporting CP. Sporting CP defeated Vitória de Guimarães, 4–0 in the final to win their sixth Taça de Portugal.

First round
Teams from the Primeira Liga (I) and the Portuguese Second Division (II) entered at this stage.

|}

Second round
Vitória de Guimarães took a bye to the next round.

|}

Third round
Ties were played between the 19–26 May. Benfica took a bye to the next round.

|}

Quarter-finals
Ties were played between the 2–9 June. Mozambican side Sporting de Lourenço Marques and União da Madeira were invited to participate in the competition.

|}

Semi-finals
Ties were played between the 16–23 June.

|}

Final

References

Taça de Portugal seasons
1962–63 domestic association football cups
Taca